Rajiv Jain (born 17 March 1957) was the Director of the Intelligence Bureau of India. He belonged to 1980 batch of the Indian Police Service. He is from the Jharkhand cadre and was appointed on 1 January 2017 as the 26th Director of Intelligence Bureau after the retirement of Dineshwar Sharma.

Biography
Rajiv Jain is the recipient of President’s Police Medal and has served in various departments of the Intelligence Bureau, including the sensitive Kashmir desk. He was the advisor to the previous NDA government’s interlocutor on Kashmir, KC Pant, when talks were held with separatist leaders like Shabbir Shah.

See also
 Intelligence Bureau
 Director of the Intelligence Bureau
 Indian Police Service

References

Indian police officers
Spymasters
Indian spies
Living people
Indian police chiefs
Directors of Intelligence Bureau (India)
1957 births